George B. Fox  (December 1, 1868 – May 8, 1914) was a first baseman in Major League Baseball in the 19th century. He played for the Louisville Colonels of the American Association in 1891 and the Pittsburgh Pirates of the National League in 1899. He played in the minors between his two Major League stints.

Sources

1868 births
1914 deaths
Baseball players from Pennsylvania
Major League Baseball first basemen
Major League Baseball third basemen
Major League Baseball catchers
Louisville Colonels players
Pittsburgh Pirates players
19th-century baseball players
Lebanon (minor league baseball) players
Hazleton Pugilists players
Allentown (minor league baseball) players
Lancaster (minor league baseball) players
Danville (minor league baseball) players
Reading Actives players
Pottsville Colts players
Shamokin (minor league baseball) players
Philadelphia Athletics (minor league) players
Norfolk Jewels players
Reading Coal Heavers players
Mansfield Haymakers players